Louis-Marie Grignion de Montfort (31 January 1673 – 28 April 1716) was a French Roman Catholic priest and confessor. He was known in his time as a preacher and was made a missionary apostolic by Pope Clement XI.

As well as preaching, Montfort found time to write a number of books which went on to become classic Catholic titles and influenced several popes. Montfort is known for his particular devotion to the Blessed Virgin Mary and the practice of praying the rosary.

Montfort is considered one of the notable writers in the field of Mariology. His most notable works regarding Marian devotions are contained in Secret of the Rosary and True Devotion to Mary.

The Roman Catholic Church, under the pontificate of Pope Pius XII, canonized Montfort on 20 July 1947. A "founders statue" created by Giacomo Parisini is located in an upper niche of the south nave of St. Peter's Basilica.

Early years

He was born in 1673 in Montfort-sur-Meu, the eldest surviving child of eighteen born to Jean-Baptiste and Jeanne Robert Grignion. His father was a notary. Louis-Marie passed most of his infancy and early childhood in Iffendic, a few kilometers from Montfort, where his father had bought a farm. At the age of 12, he entered the Jesuit College of St Thomas Becket in Rennes, where his uncle was a parish priest.

At the end of his ordinary schooling, he began his studies of philosophy and theology, still at St Thomas in Rennes.
Listening to the stories of a local priest, the Abbé Julien Bellier, about his life as an itinerant missionary, he was inspired to preach missions among the very poor. Bellier was propagating among his students a consecration and entrustment to Mary. Under the guidance of Bellier and other priests, de Montfort began to develop his strong devotion to the Blessed Virgin Mary.

He was then given the opportunity, through a benefactor, to go to Paris to study at the renowned Seminary of Saint-Sulpice towards the end of 1693. When he arrived in Paris, it was to find that his benefactor had not provided enough money for him, so he lodged in a succession of boarding houses, living among the very poor, in the meantime attending the Sorbonne University for lectures in theology. After less than two years, he became very ill and had to be hospitalized, but survived his hospitalization and the blood letting that was part of his treatment at the time.

Upon his release from the hospital, to his surprise he found himself with a place reserved at the Little Saint-Sulpice, which he entered in July 1695. Saint-Sulpice had been founded by Jean-Jacques Olier, one of the leading exponents of what came to be known as the French school of spirituality. Given that he was appointed the librarian, his time at Saint-Sulpice gave him the opportunity to study most of the available works on spirituality and, in particular, on the Virgin Mary's place in the Christian life. This later led to his focus on the Holy Rosary and his acclaimed book the Secret of the Rosary.

Devotion to the angels
Even as a seminarian in Paris, Montfort was known for the veneration he had toward the angels: he "urged his confreres to show marks of respect and tenderness to their guardian angels." He often ended his letters with a salutation to the guardian angel of the person to whom he was writing: "I salute your guardian angel". He also saluted all the angels in the city of Nantes, a custom that, it appears, he repeated when he entered a new village or city.

One of the reasons why Montfort had such devotion to the angels is that veneration of the pure spirits was an integral part of his training and also of his culture. His college teachers, the Jesuits, were known for their zeal in propagating devotion to the angels. Montfort's seminary training under the Sulpicians brought him into contact with the thought of Cardinal de Bérulle and Olier, both of whom had deep veneration for the angels. Furthermore, in the course of the seventeenth and eighteenth centuries, manuals of piety and treatises on the pure spirits were numerous.

From priest to preacher
He was ordained a priest in June 1700, and assigned to Nantes. His great desire was to go to the foreign missions, preferably to the new French colony of Canada, but his spiritual director advised against it. His letters of this period show that he felt frustrated from the lack of opportunity to preach as he felt he was called to do.

In November 1700 he joined the Third Order of the Dominicans and asked permission not only to preach the rosary, but also to form rosary confraternities. He began to consider the formation of a small company of priests to preach missions and retreats under the standard and protection of the Blessed Virgin. This eventually led to the formation of the Company of Mary. At around this time, when he was appointed the chaplain of the hospital of Poitiers, he first met Marie Louise Trichet. That meeting became the beginning of Marie Louise's 34 years of service to the poor.

Desiring to be a missionary, Montfort made a pilgrimage to Rome to ask the advice of Pope Clement XI. The Pope recognized his real vocation and, telling him there was plenty of scope for its exercise in France, sent him back with the title of Apostolic Missionary. On his return from his long pilgrimage to Rome, Montfort made a retreat at Mont Saint Michel "to pray to this archangel to obtain from him the grace to win souls for God, to confirm those already in God's grace, and to fight Satan and sin". These occasions gave him time to think, contemplate and write.

For several years he preached in missions from Brittany to Nantes. As his reputation as a missioner grew, he became known as "the good Father from Montfort".  At Pontchateau he attracted hundreds of people to help him in the construction of a huge Calvary. However, on the very eve of its blessing, the Bishop, having heard it was to be destroyed on the orders of the King of France under the influence of members of the Jansenist school, forbade its benediction. It is reported that upon receiving this news, he simply said, "Blessed be God."

Final years

He left Nantes and the next several years were extraordinarily busy for him. He was constantly occupied in preaching missions, always walking between one and another. Yet he found time also to write:  his True Devotion to Mary, The Secret of Mary and the Secret of the Rosary, rules for the Company of Mary and the Daughters of Wisdom, and many hymns. His missions made a great impact, especially in the Vendée.

The heated style of his preaching was regarded by some people as somewhat strange and he was poisoned once. Although it did not prove fatal, it caused his health to deteriorate. Yet he continued, undeterred. He went on preaching and established free schools for the poor boys and girls.

Daughters of Wisdom
The bishop of La Rochelle had been impressed with Montfort for some time and invited him to open a school there. Montfort enlisted the help of his follower Marie Louise Trichet, who was then running the General Hospital in Poitiers. In 1715 Marie Louise and Catherine Brunet left Poitiers for La Rochelle to open the school there and in a short time it had 400 students.

On 22 August 1715 Trichet and Brunet, along with Marie Valleau and Marie Régnier from La Rochelle, received the approbation of Bishop de Champflour of La Rochelle to make their religious profession under the direction of Montfort. At the ceremony Montfort told them: "Call yourselves the Daughters of Wisdom, for the teaching of children and the care of the poor." The Daughters of Wisdom grew into an international organization and the placing of Montfort's founders statue in Saint Peter's Basilica was based on that organization.

Death and burial
Montfort's 16 years of priesthood include many months of solitude, perhaps as many as a total of four years; at the cave of Mervent, amidst the beauty of the forest, at the hermitage of Saint Lazarus near the village of Montfort, and at the hermitage of Saint Eloi in La Rochelle.

Worn out by hard work and sickness, he finally came in April 1716 to Saint-Laurent-sur-Sèvre to begin the mission which was to be his last. During it, he fell ill and died on 28 April of that year. He was 43 years old, and had been a priest for only 16 years. His last sermon was on the tenderness of Jesus and the Incarnate Wisdom of the Father. Thousands gathered for his burial in the parish church, and very quickly there were stories of miracles performed at his tomb.

Exactly 43 years later, on April 28th 1759, Marie Louise Trichet also died in Saint-Laurent-sur-Sèvre and was buried next to Montfort. On 19 September 1996 Pope John Paul II (who beatified Trichet) came to the same site to meditate and pray at their adjacent tombs.

Spirituality

 "God Alone": was the motto of Montfort and is repeated over 150 times in his writings. 
 The Incarnation: "The Incarnation of the Word is for him the absolute central reality."
 Love of the Blessed Virgin Mary
 Fidelity to the Cross
 Missionary Zeal

Total Consecration to Jesus through Mary
In Montfort's approach to Marian consecration, Jesus and Mary are inseparable. He views "consecration to Jesus in Mary" as a special path to being conformed to, united and consecrated to Christ, given that
" ...of all creatures the one most conformed to Jesus Christ, it follows that among all devotions that which most consecrates and conforms a soul to our Lord is devotion to Mary, his Holy Mother, and that the more a soul is consecrated to her the more will it be consecrated to Jesus Christ."
"God the Father made an assemblage of all the waters, and He named it the sea (mare). He has made an assemblage of all His graces, and He has called it Mary (Maria)."

According to Montfort, "Mary is the safest, easiest, shortest, and most perfect way of approaching Jesus."

Montfort's process of Total Consecration has seven elements and effects: knowledge of one's unworthiness, sharing in Mary's faith, the gift of pure love, unlimited confidence in God and Mary, communication of the Spirit of Mary, transformation into the likeness of Jesus, and bringing more glory to Christ. Montfort's practice of consecration to Mary has both internal and external components. The internal components focus on surrendering oneself as a slave to Mary and to Jesus through her, and performing all actions "with Mary, in Mary, through Mary and for Mary". The suggested exterior practices include enrolment in Marian societies, or joining Marian religious orders, making Marian privileges known and appreciated, and giving alms in honor of Mary.

Louis de Montfort influenced a number of popes.

 In the 19th century, Pope Pius IX considered it the best and most acceptable form of Marian devotion, while Pope Leo XIII granted indulgences for practicing Montfort's method of Marian consecration. Leo beatified Montfort in 1888, selecting for Montfort's beatification the day of his own Golden Jubilee as a priest.
 In the 20th century Pope Pius X acknowledged the influence of Montfort's writings in the composition of his encyclical Ad diem illum.
 Pope Pius XI stated that he had practiced Montfort's devotional methods since his early youth. Pope Pius XII declared Montfort a saint and stated that Montfort is the guide "who leads you to Mary and from Mary to Jesus."
 Pope John Paul II once recalled how as a young seminarian he "read and reread many times and with great spiritual profit" a work of de Montfort and that: "Then I understood that I could not exclude the Lord's Mother from my life without neglecting the will of God-Trinity." According to his Apostolic Letter Rosarium Virginis Mariae, the pontiff's personal motto was "Totus Tuus." The thoughts, writings, and example of Louis de Montfort were also singled out by Pope John Paul II's encyclical Redemptoris Mater as a distinctive witness of Marian spirituality in the Roman Catholic tradition.

Works 
 Preparation for Total Consecration according to Saint Louis de Montfort
 Secret of the Rosary
 Letters of St. Louis Marie
 The Love of Eternal Wisdom
 Letter to the Friends of the Cross
 The Admirable secret of the Rosary
 Methods for Saying the Rosary
 The Secret of Mary
 True Devotion to Mary
 Prayer for Missionaries
 Manuscript Rule of the Company of Mary
 Letter to the Members of the Company of Mary
 The "Wisdom Cross" of Poitiers
 Original Rule of the Daughters of Wisdom
 Letter to the Inhabitants of Montbernage
 Rules for Various Groups
 The Will of St. Louis Marie
 Morning and Night Prayers

Priest and poet
While Montfort is best known for his spiritual writings, he was also a poet and during his missions managed to compose more than 20,000 verses of hymns. Montfort's hymns and canticles were, for the most part, meant to be sung in village churches and in the homes of the poor. Some authors argue that a reading of Montfort's hymns is essential for an understanding of him as a man and for appreciating his approach to spirituality.<ref>Hymns of Saint Louis de Montfort at EWTN [http://www.ewtn.com/library/Montfort/Handbook/Hymns.htm Jesus Living in Mary]</ref>

Based on the analysis of Bishop Hendrik Frehen of the Company of Mary, Montfortian hymns fall into two major categories: "inspired" and "didactic." The inspired canticles flow spontaneously, on the occasion of a pilgrimage to a Marian shrine, or on the occasion of a joyful celebration. The didactic hymns took more effort and time to compose, and focus on instructional and informative qualities: they teach the audience through the use of a moral and a theme. After Montfort's death, the Company of Mary (which continued his work of preaching parish renewals) made great use of his hymns and used them as instruments of evangelization.

He is also said to have carved at least three statues depicting the Madonna and Child.

Legacy

 Congregations de Montfort 
The congregations Montfort left behind, the Company of Mary, the Daughters of Wisdom, and the Brothers of Saint Gabriel (which congregation developed from the group of lay-brothers gathered around him), grew and spread, first in France, then throughout the world.

The Servants of the Lord and the Virgin of Matará follow the spirituality of Louis de Montfort.

Montfort's birthplace and tomb are now sites of "Montfortian pilgrimages" with about 25,000 visitors each year. The house in which he was born is at No 15, Rue de la Saulnerie in Montfort-sur-Meu. It is now jointly owned by the three Montfortian congregations he formed.  The Basilica of Saint Louis de Montfort at Saint-Laurent-sur-Sèvre attracts a number of pilgrims each year.

Montfort is the patron saint of a number of prestigious schools that educate youths from all walks of life, including St. Gabriel's Secondary School and Montfort Secondary School in Singapore, the Assumption College In Thailand, and the Montfort Academy, a private secondary school in Mount Vernon, New York.

Biographies

There are more than a hundred biographies written of Montfort. They differ in how they reflect the ecclesial and cultural milieu within which each was written.

The first four biographies of Montfort, by Grandet, Blain, Besnard, and Picot de Clorivières, were all written in the eighteenth century. They reflect the hagiographical method current then—the devotional biography. Such an approach reflected little of the critical sensibility that had dominated most of the seventeenth century through the works of the Bollandists, the memorialists of Port-Royal, and Jean de Launoy. They sought to edify, praise, eulogize, and idealize. Such early biographies are filled with anachronism, incoherence, and over-generalization. Despite such limitations, Montfort's early biographers provide valuable material. They have preserved eyewitness accounts and original documents, and they offer a solid historical foundation for reconstructing many of the truths of Montfort's life.

The nineteenth century's "romanticized" conception of history influenced hagiography in two main ways. 1) Although a biography should relive the outer events of a saint's past, it was more important to describe the interior drama of his soul. 2) The nineteenth-century biographies of Montfort reflect this historiographic orientation. Two biographies were prepared for the Montfort's beatification, one by Fonteneau and the other by Persiani. The latter is almost a translation of the former (1887). They limited themselves to recounting the events that took place and did not go into Montfort's psychology. On the other hand, Pauvert (1875) published a collection of Montfort's unpublished letters and established a chronology of the first years of his priesthood. A. Crosnier's biography (1927) was also influenced by nineteenth-century romanticism. Just before Montfort's canonization appeared De Luca (1943). The author took into account the literary and spiritual milieu of seventeenth-century France and attempted to introduce his readers to Montfort's spiritual life, pointing out "phases" in Montfort's growth and development.

Of the different genres of biography that purport to describe the events of someone's life, the "realistic" biography is popular with some today. Such a method is apparent in the four works dedicated by Louis Perouas to Grignion de Montfort (1966, 1973, 1989, 1990). The author separated himself from his predecessors by describing Montfort, his life, and his pastoral work using a historical-critical and psycho-sociological approach. Perouas held that the Breton saint's path was a "tormented journey" because he had difficulty dealing with a strained relationship with his father, who was known for his violent temper. His long and arduous journey toward a balanced life came to a "certain maturation for Father de Montfort when he was in his forties." Generally more acceptable than Perouas’ Freudian psychological interpretation is his understanding of Montfort's ministry in the context of the sociological and pastoral realities of his times.

See also

 Brothers of Christian Instruction of St Gabriel
 Company of Mary
 Daughters of Wisdom
 Marie Louise Trichet
 Saint Louis de Montfort's Prayer to Jesus
 Legion of Mary

References

Sources
 de Montfort, Louis. Preparation for Total Consecration according to the Method of St. Louis de Montfort. Bay Shore NY: Montfort Publications, 2001.
 de Montfort, Louis. God Alone: The Collected Writings of St. Louis Marie De Montfort Montfort Publications, 1995 
 Doherty, Eddie. Wisdom's Fool: A biography of St. Louis de Montfort. Bay Shore NY: Montfort Publications, 1993.
 Fiores, Stefano.  Dictionnaire de Spiritualité Montfortaine. (1360 pag.)Novalis, 1994
 
 Smith, Jr., Scott L. St. Louis de Montfort's Total Consecration to Jesus through Mary - New Easier-to-Read Translation, Holy Water Books, 2019, 

Further reading
 DiNoia, J. Augustine. 1996, The love that never ends'' OSV Press

External links
 Founded by de Montfort.
Catholic Books including True Devotion to Mary free online
 International Marian Research Institute at the University of Dayton. The Institute, a leading center for research and scholarship on the Blessed Virgin Mary, has a vast presence in cyberspace.
 Marian Library at the University of Dayton. The Marian Library is the world's largest repository of books, periodicals, artwork, and artifacts on Mary, the mother of Jesus Christ.
Montfort Center
"Saint Louis Marie de Montfort" article at Catholicism.org
Montfort, Secret of Mary
 
 

1673 births
1716 deaths
People from Ille-et-Vilaine
Brothers of Christian Instruction of St Gabriel
18th-century French Catholic theologians
17th-century French Catholic theologians
French school of spirituality
French Roman Catholic saints
Pope Leo XIII
Counter-Reformation
Canonizations by Pope Pius XII
Catholic Mariology
Dominican mystics
18th-century Christian saints
Early modern Christian devotional writers
Breton saints